Yamdena is an Austronesian language of Yamdena and surrounding islands in the Maluku Islands in Indonesia.

Phonology

Consonants 

 Stops  can very rarely be realized as coarticulated sounds  by some speakers.
  can be heard as voiceless  in free variation when before initial voiceless stops, or after voiceless stops.
  is heard as labialized  when occurring before liquids, or in word-final position.
  when occurring before  can also be heard as palatal stops .

Vowels 

 Vowels  can be heard as  within unstressed syllables.
  can be heard as  word-finally, after vowels.
  can be heard as  when before .

References

Central Malayo-Polynesian languages
Languages of the Maluku Islands